The Borough of Warrington is a unitary authority area with borough status in the ceremonial county of Cheshire, North West England. The borough is centred around the town of Warrington, and extends out into outlying areas such as Lymm, Great Sankey, and Birchwood. The borough is geographically located to the north and northeast of the Cheshire West and Chester and Halton districts in Cheshire, the metropolitan borough of St Helens in Merseyside to the northwest and north and the metropolitan boroughs of Wigan and Trafford in Greater Manchester to the northeast, east, and southeast. Additionally, to the south-east, the borough borders Cheshire East. The borough is also located between the cities of Liverpool, Salford, Manchester, Chester and Preston. The district straddles the historic counties of Cheshire (the South part of the district includes Lymm and Stockton Heath) and Lancashire (the North part including Warrington itself and Latchford).

Civil parishes
The borough contains the unparished area of Warrington and 18 civil parishes:
 Appleton
 Birchwood (Town Council)
 Burtonwood and Westbrook
 Croft
 Cuerdley
 Culcheth and Glazebury
 Grappenhall and Thelwall
 Great Sankey
 Hatton
 Lymm
 Penketh
 Poulton-with-Fearnhead
 Rixton-with-Glazebrook
 Stockton Heath
 Stretton
 Walton
 Winwick
 Woolston

History
The borough was historically split between the historic counties of Cheshire and Lancashire.

The whole part of the borough (north of the River Mersey) is within the historic boundaries of the county of Lancashire which includes the town of Warrington, and the areas of Latchford, Great Sankey, Culcheth, Glazebury, Burtonwood and Birchwood. 

The whole part of the borough (south of the River Mersey) is within the historic boundaries of the county of Cheshire which includes the villages of Lymm, Stockton Heath,  Appleton Thorn and Stretton. These remain in the same county now unchanged by the reforms. In 1974, following the local government reforms which saw many old counties and districts abolished and new counties or districts were created. Warrington along with the neighboring town of Widnes was moved into the county of Cheshire which saw the entire area from the border with Speke/Widnes to Glazebury/Cadishead moved into the county of Cheshire. The current borough was formed from the County Borough of Warrington, the wards of Culcheth and Newchurch in Golborne Urban District, Warrington Rural District and part of the parish of Bold in Whiston Rural District, in Lancashire and Lymm Urban District and the parishes of Appleton, Grappenhall, Hatton, Stockton Heath, Stretton and Walton from Runcorn Rural District in Lancashire. The M62 motorway forms a border with both Greater Manchester and Merseyside. 

The borough became a unitary authority in 1998 alongside Halton making it separate from the-then Cheshire County Council before the 2009 restructuring of local government which saw the county council abolished and replaced by two new unitary authorities, Cheshire East and Cheshire West (and Chester). All four unitary authorities still form Cheshire for ceremonial purposes and share local services.

References

External links

Warrington Borough Council

 
Unitary authority districts of England
Districts of Cheshire
Cheshire and Warrington Local Enterprise Partnership
Boroughs in England